This armorial of sovereign states shows the coat of arms, national emblem, or seal for every sovereign state. Although some countries do not have an official national emblem, unofficial emblems which are de facto used as national emblems are also shown below.

Note that due to copyright restrictions in some countries (including Afghanistan, Canada, South Africa, and Qatar), some emblems are not displayed, or may be displayed with slight alterations in appearance from their official rendition, but nonetheless remain faithful to their heraldic description.



Member states and observers of the United Nations

A

B

C

D

E

F

G

H

I

J

K

L

M

N

O

P

Q

R

S

T

U

V

Y

Z

Other states

See also 

 Armorial of dependent territories
 Gallery of flags of dependent territories
 Armorial of Africa
 Armorial of North America
 Armorial of South America
 Armorial of Asia
 Armorial of Europe
 Armorial of Oceania
 Gallery of sovereign state flags

Notes

Citations

External links 
 NGW.nl, Heraldry of the world: International Civic Arms (33,000 arms of countries, states etc.)

 
 
Lists of national symbols